Rhinoleucophenga is a genus of fruit flies (insects in the family Drosophilidae). There are at least 20 described species in Rhinoleucophenga.

Species
These 20 species belong to the genus Rhinoleucophenga:

 Rhinoleucophenga americana (Patterson, 1943) c g
 Rhinoleucophenga angustifrons Malogolowkin, 1946 c g
 Rhinoleucophenga bezzii Duda, 1927 c g
 Rhinoleucophenga bivisualis (Patterson, 1943) c g
 Rhinoleucophenga brasiliensis (Lima, 1950) c
 Rhinoleucophenga breviplumata Duda, 1927 c g
 Rhinoleucophenga fluminensis (Lima, 1950) c g
 Rhinoleucophenga gigantea (Thomson, 1869) c g
 Rhinoleucophenga lopesi Malogolowkin, 1946 c g
 Rhinoleucophenga matogrossensis Malogolowkin, 1946 c g
 Rhinoleucophenga nigrescens Malogolowkin, 1946 c g
 Rhinoleucophenga obesa (Loew, 1872) i c g b
 Rhinoleucophenga pallida Hendel, 1917 c g
 Rhinoleucophenga personata Malogolowkin, 1946 c g
 Rhinoleucophenga punctulata Duda, 1929 c g
 Rhinoleucophenga punctuloides g
 Rhinoleucophenga sonoita (Wheeler, 1949) c g
 Rhinoleucophenga stigma Hendel, 1917 c g
 Rhinoleucophenga subradiata Duda, 1929 c g
 Rhinoleucophenga trivisualis g

Data sources: i = ITIS, c = Catalogue of Life, g = GBIF, b = Bugguide.net

References

Further reading

 

Drosophilidae genera
Articles created by Qbugbot